The Aragonese Party (PAR) is a political party which advocates the interests of Aragon within Spain. The party was founded in 1978 under the name Aragonese Regionalist Party, but changed its name in 1990, keeping the initials PAR. The founders of PAR included Emilio Eiroa, who later served as the President of the Government of Aragon from 1991 to 1993.

PAR had representation in the European Parliament (1999–2004) where it sat in the European Coalition group.

Electoral performance

Cortes of Aragon

References

External links
Official website 

Political parties in Aragon
Political parties established in 1978
Regionalist parties in Spain
Centrist parties in Spain
1978 establishments in Spain